Don Néroman (sometimes spelled Dom Néroman, pen-name of Pierre Rougié) was an astrologer born June 18, 1884 in Gramat, Lot department, France, and died in 1953.

Néroman was among those astrologers who sought to eliminate superstitions from astrology and develop its scientific components.  In 1943 he wrote Traité d'astrologie rationelle (1943), Grandeur et pitié d'astrologie (1940).
Néroman founded the Collège astrologique de France in Paris, which published its own journal from 1936 to 1955, the Bulletin du Collège astrologique de France.

Among the more distinctive aspects of his work was study of the Lunar Apogee, as well as Astrogeography techniques that were later developed and popularized by American astrologer Jim Lewis as Astro*Carto*Graphy.

References
 Néroman as a scientific astrologer (opinion, in English)
 Néroman and the Lunar Apogee (in English)
 Néroman and the Collège astrologique de France (in French)

1884 births
1953 deaths
French astrologers
20th-century astrologers